The Auk class were a class of minesweepers serving with the United States Navy and the Royal Navy during the Second World War. In total, there were 93 Auks built.

Design and development
From these two examples it was decided that the use of Diesel-electric engines to power the ship and the minesweeping equipment, rather than separate geared diesel engines to propel the ship and diesel generators to energize the minesweeping equipment, would work better. The Royal Navy placed an order for 32 of these minesweepers from the United States, BAM-1-BAM-32.

The Auks armament varied. All were equipped with a single  gun on the bow, but many had their aft 3-inch gun removed or replace by two  Bofors guns. Originally designed with four  Oerlikon cannons, some ships mounted as many as eight.

Five manufactures provided the diesel-electric engines used in the class. These included the Cleveland Diesel Engine Division of General Motors, Cooper Bessemer, Baldwin Locomotive Works, the American Locomotive Company (ALCO), and Busch-Sulzer.

Twenty of the original 32 ships ordered by the Royal Navy were delivered, with an additional two coming from the USN program. They were given "J" pennant number prefixes. Of these twenty-two, three were sunk in action, and 19 were returned to the US after the war.

Construction
The ships were constructed in 11 different shipyards, by 10 different companies, in 9 different states. 

American Ship Building Company, Lorain, Ohio
American Ship Building Company, Cleveland, Ohio
Associated Shipbuilders, Puget Sound, Washington
Defoe Shipbuilding Company, Bay City, Michigan
General Engineering & Dry Dock Company, Alameda, California
Gulf Shipbuilding, Madisonville, Louisiana
John H. Mathis & Company, Camden, New Jersey
Norfolk Navy Yard, Norfolk, Virginia
Pennsylvania Shipyards, Inc., Beaumont, Texas
Savannah Machine & Foundry, Savannah, Georgia
Winslow Marine Railway and Shipbuilding Company, Puget Sound, Washington

List of ships

Royal Navy Catherine-class minesweepers

US Navy Auk-class minesweepers

See also

 
 
 
 Classes of U.S. Navy minesweepers

References

Bibliography

Further reading
 

 

 
Mine warfare vessel classes
Naval ships of the Philippines
Ship classes of the Royal Navy